Lindsay Ann Tarpley Snow (born September 22, 1983) is an American professional soccer forward and midfielder. She is a two-time Olympic gold medalist, winning gold at the 2004 Athens and 2008 Beijing Summer Olympics, and was a member of the United States women's national team that finished third at the 2007 Women's World Cup in China.

She injured her knee during a match against Japan, on May 14, 2011, in Columbus Ohio, consequently missing the 2011 Women's World Cup, and has not been called again to play for her national team. On February 7, 2013, Tarpley was drafted to play with the Chicago Red Stars for the 2013 NWSL season.

Early life
Born in Madison, Wisconsin, Tarpley grew up in Kalamazoo, Michigan, and attended Portage Central High School from 1998 to 2002.  During her freshman season, she helped her school's women's soccer team reach the state semi-finals.  In the following spring, she led her team to an undefeated season and the state championship.  Against Bishop Foley Catholic High School in the final match, she scored her team's first goal and assisted on her team's other two, including the winning shot in the penalty shootout.  She received several honors during her time there, including being named the 2002 Michigan Gatorade Player of the Year and the 2002 U.S. Soccer Chevrolet Young Female Player of the Year, in addition to being a 1999 NSCAA All-American and a Parade All-American in 2001 and 2002.  She also played varsity basketball for Portage Central, starting at point guard during all four of her seasons.

While in high school, Tarpley played for W-League side Kalamazoo Quest in 1998 and 1999.

University of North Carolina
In the autumn of 2002, Tarpley enrolled at the University of North Carolina.  While there, she majored in communications and minored in coaching.  She was a student-athlete, and competed with the university's North Carolina Tar Heels women's soccer team.  In her first season with the team, she was named ACC Rookie of the Year and the Soccer America and Soccer Buzz National Freshman of the Year.

During her sophomore season, Tarpley led the nation in total points (goals and assists) while leading the Tar Heels to the 2003 NCAA Women's Soccer Championship.  Against Connecticut Huskies in the finals, she scored two goals and had two assists en route to winning the title.  She received numerous honors for her performance throughout the 2003 season, including ACC Player of the Year and Player of the Tournament, National Player of the Year, and several All-America team honors.

Injuries interfered with Tarpley's junior and senior seasons, which reduced her playing time.  Tarpley still managed to be named to the All-ACC and NSCAA All-America teams in both seasons.

Tarpley finished her North Carolina career with 59 goals and 59 assists.  Her number 25 jersey was retired by the school in February 2006 during the halftime of a North Carolina Tar Heels men's basketball game.

Playing career

Club

W-League

Tarpley played for the New Jersey Wildcats in 2005, where she played alongside Tobin Heath, Christine Latham, Karina LeBlanc, Heather O'Reilly, Cat Whitehill, Rachel Yankey, and a number of other international players.  She played in five games (374 minutes) for the club, and scored two goals with two assists.

Women's Professional Soccer

Upon the creation of a new top-flight women's league in the United States, Tarpley agreed to join Women's Professional Soccer.  She was allocated to Chicago Red Stars along with USWNT players Carli Lloyd and Kate Markgraf.  In the inaugural 2009 Women's Professional Soccer season, Tarpley appeared in 17 games (16 starts, 1321 total minutes) and scored four goals and four assists.

On January 15, 2010 Lindsay was traded to the Saint Louis Athletica in exchange for goalkeeper Jillian Loyden. With the Athletica, she joined former North Carolina Tar Heel standouts Lori Chalupny, Kendall Fletcher and Kristina Larsen.

She became a free agent on June 1, 2010 with the dissolution of the Saint Louis Athletica. On June 3, it was announced by the Boston Breakers that they had signed Tarpley. She then signed for magicJack ahead of the 2011 Women's Professional Soccer season.

International
Tarpley began her international career representing the United States on the U-16 Girls National Team.  From there, she successfully moved to the United States U-19 team in 2002.  She played in the 2002 FIFA U-19 Women's World Championship, the first FIFA-sanctioned youth tournament for women, and scored the title clinching goal in extra time against Canada.  She made 26 total appearances and scored 24 goals.

Tarpley soon moved to the United States U-21 team, where she made 8 appearances and scored 4 goals.  Half of her goals were scored at the 2003 Nordic Cup, while the other half was at the 2005 Nordic Cup.

Tarpley first appeared for the senior team on January 12, 2003 against Japan.  Her first (and second) goal came a little over a year later on January 30, 2004 against Sweden.  She appeared in the 2004 and 2008 editions of the Olympic Games, winning a gold medal in each trip.  She has also played in the 2007 FIFA Women's World Cup, in which the United States finished third.  She earned her 100th cap on July 16, 2008 against Brazil in the last game before the 2008 Olympics, the 23rd player in USWNT history to reach this feat.

A torn anterior cruciate ligament sustained in a warm-up match with Japan saw Tarpley ruled out of the 2011 FIFA Women's World Cup.

International goals

Honors and awards

International

 Olympic Games Gold Medal: 2004, 2008
 FIFA Women's World Cup:Third Place: 2007 China

University

 NCAA Women's Soccer Championship: 2003

Individual

 National Freshman of the Year: 2002
 NCAA Division I Scoring Leader: 2003
 College Soccer Player of the Year: 2003

Personal life
Tarpley's husband, B. J. Snow, was appointed in January 2011 to coach the UCLA Bruins women's soccer team. In July 2012, Tarpley and Snow had their first child, a son. In January 2013, B. J. Snow was appointed as the full-time head coach of United States women's national under-17 soccer team.

References

Match report

External links

 
 
 Official blog
 US Soccer player profile
 New Jersey Wildcats player profile
 North Carolina player profile

Living people
1983 births
American women's soccer players
United States women's international soccer players
Soccer players from Michigan
Soccer players from Wisconsin
Sportspeople from Kalamazoo, Michigan
North Carolina Tar Heels women's soccer players
Olympic gold medalists for the United States in soccer
Footballers at the 2004 Summer Olympics
Footballers at the 2008 Summer Olympics
Chicago Red Stars players
Saint Louis Athletica players
Boston Breakers players
MagicJack (WPS) players
FIFA Century Club
2007 FIFA Women's World Cup players
USL W-League (1995–2015) players
Sportspeople from Madison, Wisconsin
Medalists at the 2008 Summer Olympics
Parade High School All-Americans (girls' soccer)
Women's association football midfielders
Women's association football forwards
Women's Professional Soccer players
Medalists at the 2004 Summer Olympics
Sports businesswomen
American women business executives
American business executives
New Jersey Wildcats players